It is not easy to trace out the origins of the Telugu folk literature, for that matter any folk literature. It is as difficult as tracing the origin of a language. In other words, one can argue that the origin and existence of any folk literature can be a parallel phenomenon along with that language, because the folk expressive traditions of any ethnic group are much earlier than the language of that particular ethnic group. Need not say about the developed literature in written tradition. The cave paintings and line drawings found in different archeological sites prove the ability of the creative expressions of prehistoric human beings even before they were not able to speak. The addition of verbal creativity in latter periods has widened the folk expressive tradition in another medium that is verbal folk arts or the folk literature. Therefore, the existence of any folk literature can go back to the time of the given language correspondingly.

The origins of Telugu folk literature
Telugu is the most widely spoken Dravidian language on Earth and is spoken in all of Telangana and Andhra Pradesh in India and parts of other southern states as well. The history of Telugu goes back as early as to 230 BC to 225 AD, and the evidence for the existence of Telugu language is available in the Natya Shastra of the Bharatha people. Even better evidence is shown from the inscription of Nandampudi, written by the first Telugu poet Nannya, which goes back to the 11th century AD. The author of Samagrandhra Sahityam (The Comprehensive history of Telugu Literature) Aarudhra has developed a different kind of argument. He says the word "naagabu" is there in an inscription of the Amaravati Stupa Buddha Sthupa, built between 200 BC to 200 AD the suffix of this word 'bu' is a typical Telugu suffix and it can not be there unless the language was considerably developed in spoken form. (He considered the word a sacred 'mantra' and printed it on the top place of the cover page of his book). More reliable evidence for the existence of Telugu language were shown by him at least from 350 AD. Based on this evidence it is possible to come to a rough idea that the verbal expressive traditions of Telugus may be there even at the beginning of the common era.

Indisputable concrete historical evidence of Telugu folk literature is available in the poetical work of the Kumārasambhava by Nanne Choda who belongs to the 11th and 12th centuries. He has mentioned different kinds of songs sung by different folk groups (goudu geetamulu or songs of gouds). Some more inscriptional evidence for the existence of folk literature are also available in the 6th century AD. According to Ramaraju, some of the prosodic structures found in this period very closely resemble to the metrical order of folk songs of modern times. The evidence may not clearly show a particular song or its existence but one cannot rule out the possible existence of folk literature even before this period as the evidence for the existence of Telugu language was there from a much earlier period.

Many traditional Telugu poetical works of earlier and medieval age, taking form the Palkuriki Somanadha's Basava purana to the Yakshagana (written works) of Nayaka kings of the 17th century, have mentioned about different performing castes and performing traditions, which were living and moving in the Andhra desa i.e., the present Andhra Pradesh.

Taxonomy of Telugu folk literary genres
The Telugu folk literature is so enormously rich that it contains all major categories of world folk literature. The folk literary categories, which were classified in various languages by the scholars across the world, can be found in the Telugu folk literature. Some unique kind of folk literary forms like caste myth also can be found in it. It is very rich not only in terms of variety of genres but the enormous size of the repertoires of various performing castes and individual singers. Many scholars have already classified Telugu folk literature in different divisions and sub divisions in an efficient way depending on the material they have considered for the study. Krishna Kumari's classification is more comprehensive even among other works on Telugu folk literature. But few genres were missing even in this classification. She did not consider caste myth as a separate genre. It occupies a large share of Telugu folk literature and a prominent place in terms of its social importance and function. And some more subdivisions can also be found in a close look at the grassroot level of Telugu folk literature.

Telugu folk literature can be classified on different aspects. The first aspect is on genre, second is on the persons and patronage, the third one is by utility. It would be convenient to elaborate in reverse direction and first I would take utility aspect.

Functional and entertainment genres
Telugu folk literature can be classified on the basis of its utility, that is, how it functions. It can be divided into functional and nonfunctional or entertainment genres. Some of the literary forms are both. Caste myths and ritual narratives have specific social functions. They are not for entertainment. They are intended to carry a specific social function.

Caste myths
A caste myth is basically a myth by its sacrality, and it is unique by its structure and function. A caste myth is called a Kula Purana or Caste Purana. Names of these myths are formed along the name of the caste, like Gouda purana for the caste of Goudas, Rjaka puranams for Rajakas or Chakalivaru Washer men and so on. A caste myth is a myth or a narrative of a caste which explains the origin and establishment of a caste. It tries to establish a given caste as a higher most one in the social order and it is not inferior to any other caste. Each caste of 196 castes in Andhra Pradesh having its own Caste myth. Caste myths are very important folk literary forms in terms of their social function. They are very much alive and vigorous in functions, even in the modern democratic social order. Several evidences prove the existence of the caste myths in oral tradition and written tradition even from the 11th century. Each caste has its own myth and the time for its narration may vary from three hours to 14 nights, i.e. at least 100 hours. Most castes of Andhra Pradesh have their own performing dependent castes to narrate or perform their caste myths once in a year in each patron family. They are called Arthi kulalu or Asrita kulalu. There are more than 50 dependent performing castes still existing and functioning in A.P. A caste myth is an origin narrative of a given caste and it is the pride of the each member of any caste. It is a sacred narrative, whose validity cannot be questioned, and it is a Mahabharata for that particular caste. Caste myths are available in song, performing and prose narrative forms in oral tradition. Though it is a myth by genre, caste myth has a different kind of structure than the general myth, so that the caste myth is itself an independent folk genre. (See: Kulapuranalu Asrita Vyavastha, Subbachary, p. 2000: for the detailed study of the caste myths and the dependent caste system.)

Ritual narratives
A ritual narrative is narrative sung or performed in a ritual, as an inseparable part of that ritual. It loses its importance when it is dissociated from that ritual. It is another functional narrative. These narratives are nothing but the narratives of Goddesses and Gods. The mother goddess narratives of A.P enjoy a prominent social relevance. They are sung or performed in the Jataras or Tirunallas of the Mother goddess and the Perantalu or the deified women goddesses. The mother goddesses like Ankamma, Maremma, Poleramma, Peddamma, Atalamma, Ellamma, Pochamma and so on are considered to be the goddesses of diseases. They are the destructive or malevolent goddesses. They are also protective or guardian deities but their prominence is for their destructive power. They have to be appeased from time to time or annually, otherwise they would show their wrath by creating epidemics. The best ways to appease these goddess are to sing the narrative of the relevant goddess in her praise and offer her animal sacrifices. Performing the narrative or the puranam or the myth of the goddess is very crucial in the weekday ritual of any mother goddess. These myths are very long and performed over from one night to seven nights. The audience listens to them not only with reverence but also with fear and obedience. They also go into trance when the narratives are performed. Specific caste people from dalit communities Baindlas, Asadis are specialized and traditional singers for all these mother goddesses. The Kurumas are singers for the myths of the male gods Mallanna, Birappa and the Goddess Ellamma. The literature of these myths or the narratives is also very big repertoire in Telugu folk literature. Mother goddess narratives are performed in several hundred places in A.P. every year. A number of scholars Krishna Kumari.N, Venkata Subbarao.T.V, Premalata Ravi. Andamma.M and others have done commendable research on mother goddess worship and narratives.

Proverbs
Another important and powerful functional genre is the Telugu sameta or the Telugu proverb. Any other folk literary genre may not be a part of everyday life of the speaker of a given language. But proverbs are part of day-to-day life. For the native speakers the proverb is an essential tool for their communicative needs and it is a folk literary genre.

Telugu folk literature has a stunningly rich treasure trove of proverbs. People use them in any mode of their expression. Number of researchers have already collected thousands of proverbs and published them region wide. One scholar, Chilukuri Narayana Rao, has collected to one hundred thousand proverbs to his credit. Lot of research was also done on various aspects of Telugu proverbs. Several Colonial officials too collected Telugu proverbs. Captain Carr's collection is prominent among them. He collected around three thousand proverbs and translated them into English. One can find parallels in Telugu to the proverbs which are omnipresent in different languages across the world.

These are some of the basic Telugu folk literary forms which are in social function. The other folk literary forms or basically intended for entertainment their social function is secondary.

Persons and professional singers and patronage
The second kind of classification can be made on the basis of persons and patronage. Telugu folk literature can be divided in two major classes: folk literature created by professional singers and/or performers and the literature created by others. The folk literary genres created by the professional performers are different from the other genres in terms of length, prose and poetry combination, narration, and in other aspects. A number of castes of Andhra Pradesh are specialized to perform different kinds folk art forms in which literature is a vital part. Singing and performing is their basic profession  and they get lively hood by this profession. Again the professional singers or the bards or ministerial can be divided into two kinds some performing castes perform their art form to any caste or family of any village. For example, snake charmers or Pamula vallu, Haridasus, Satanis, Jangamas, Saradakadus and such other performers when they enter into a village they do not restrict their singing to only some castes or families. Other kind of singers do not extend their services to any body except their own patrons. They are dependents to only one caste. They narrate myths, caste myths, or other narratives only to their patrons. Narrating to others encroaching into other singer's jurisdiction is a crime according to their caste laws.

Most of the important Telugu folk narratives, myths, legends are created by the professional singers and performers of the performing caste, all the caste myths are created by the dependent caste singers or the Asritakulalavaru. Other important epics like Mahabharata, Ramayana, Palanati Virakatha, Bobbilikatha, Katamaraju Kathalu, the myths of mother goddesses, and other important lengthy wonder tales which are very popular among Telugus are created by professional singers or the caste performers.

The folk literature created by men, women, and children consists of folk songs, song narratives, lullabies, work songs, women songs, different other kind of songs, general tales, wonder tales proverbs, riddles and so on. Telugu folk literature is very rich for all these genres. Collection and researching of these folk genres has been started in the colonial period itself. After the advent of universities in A.P several scholars did research on all kinds of these genres.

The arena of folk literary genres
One classification of folk literature is genre based. Krishnakumari made a comprehensive classification of Telugu folk literature. It can be followed here to enumerate the Telugu folk literature and some more items can also be added to this classification.

The Telugu folk literature has three basic divisions.

Prose or Vachana Sakha
The Prose division has two important sections they are Katha Sahitham or Prose with story and Katha Rahitham or prose without story. The section prose with story contains Nitikathalu (moral tales) Vira Kathalu, (epics) Adbhuta Kathalu (wonder tales), Purakathalu (myths), Itihasalu (legends) Pedarasi Peddamma Kathalu (fables). Some more categories can also be identified like Kula Kathalu (caste myths in prose), Perantalla Kathalu (stories of deified women), Tirpu Kathalu (stories of judgments), and so on. The non-story prose genres are proverbs and riddles or Sametalu and Podupukathalu.

Poetry or Geya Sakha
The poetry division again has Story and non-story sections. In story section Sramika Geyamulu (work songs), Strila patalu (women songs) Asrita kulala vari Patalu (songs by different caste performers) are there. In work songs male female division is there. The songs by women while they are working in fields are very important. Several stories are revealed and they give vent to their feelings through these stories. The songs at home are different from these songs not only in rhythm but also in length and mode of narration. The women songs can be classified into vrata kathalu or the stories of women rituals and pouranika stories or the mythological stores. Songs of the professional singers or the dependent castes can be categorized into Vira Kathalu (heroic songs or ballads), Adbhuta Kathalu (wonder tales or fairy tales), Purakathalu (general myths and myths of mother goddesses), Charitraka Kathalu (historical songs) Strila kathalu (women related stories). The non-story section in the Poetry division contain three important categories they are Sharmika Geyamulu or work songs, Paramarthika Geyamulu or mystic songs and Koutumbika Geyamulu or family songs. The work songs contain stringara (erotic), hasya (humor) and karuna (pathetic) kinds of songs and the family songs contain bandhutwa (songs of relation), and achara (ceremonious songs).

Drama or Drisya Sakha
The third division is Drisya Sakha, folk drama or folk theatre. Telugu folklore is very rich in folk theatre. Most of the art forms of (more than fifty) the dependant castes are theatre forms. The art forms like Oggu katha, Bindla Katha, Kommula Katha, Sarada Katha, Burra katha, Runja Katha, Chindu Yakshaganam, chirutala Yakshaganam, Patam katha, Pandava Katha, and several folk art forms are very popular theatre forms in which the spoken word is vital, are very rich for literature. Vidhi natakam, Yakshaganam, Turpu Bhagotam, and some other folk art forms are there which are for all castes in any village. The theatre division can be classified into two sections one is theatre by the artists the other is puppet theatre. Literature is an essential ingredient even in the puppet theatre. The Ramayana story is basic theme for the shadow puppet theatre of Andhra Pradesh. Patam Katha or the scroll narrative contains the Mahabharata as its theme, entire Mahabharata is narrated in different episodes in the art form of Pandavalu and Kakipadagalu artists. Some other mythical caste mythical themes are also there is form of scroll narratives. Still there are more than 72 folk theatre art forms are living in the region.

The above classification is the general and primary genre based classification of Telugu folk literature. Innumerable number of examples for each category can be given. Each above category in all major divisions and different sections is very rich. It would be impractical in this paper to showcase them. But introducing some of the songs and narratives here would serve the purpose.

Songs of the soil
Some Telugu folk narratives are very popular in Andhra Pradesh. They are associated with the history and folk life of the region. Even the Mahabharata and Ramayana stories and a plethora of historical and semihistorical narratives in various folk art forms acclaimed wide popularity and educated the rural non-literate people. They know the gods and goddesses kings and queens primarily from the folk narratives and visual media like Vidhi natakam (street play) Tolubommalata (shadow puppet theatre) Patam katha (scroll narrative) and so on. The cinema of early times did not try to go much away from the folk art forms. Cinema has not only got interested in folk art forms but also incorporated them in many ways. Folk literature, music, and art forms have their proper places in the cinema. Folk songs and their tunes are big money-making assets even in present day Telugu cinema.

Palnati Vira Charitra
Also called Palaanati Bharatam, this epic resembles the story of Mahabharata; it also contains a ferocious battle between brothers and close relatives. It is a heroic epic of Telugus. The epic is the story of the Haihaya dynasty and belongs to the 12th century. The battle is not just for the throne or the territory it is a battle between two religious philosophies, the Vaishanavism and Shaivism. The Brahmanaidu and the Nagamma take two sides. The Brahmanaidu advocates the equality of the castes and encourages the untouchable community to enter into the temples and allow them to dine with other village caste people. The effort was popularly called Chapakudu. The other religious sect under the leadership of Nagamma opposed the ‘anarchy’ but battled in the guise of cock fight, sending the kings to forests and finally to the battle field. Finally the blood of Telugu heroes and towering philosophy of Brahmanaidu stand victorious, and remained for ever in the land. The characters Brahmanaidu, Balachandrudu, Nagamma, Manchala are very popular in the entire region. The heroes are worshipped in an annual ritual in the folk art form of Pichukunti Katha which is performed by Pichukuntis or the palnati vira vidyavantulu a performing caste of Andhra Pradesh. The singers perform the epic with swords and shields in their hands and use them as props for their performance. The principal narrator takes a sword in the right hand and a shield in the left. A bunch of jingling bells are tied to the sword. The artist uses the sword as a musical instrument and it becomes a valuable prop in the narration of story. The singer becomes a battle hero. The tunes of the songs also appear in a different way. Most of the time they create a mood of sorrow and valor. The Palnati epic is not only a pride symbol of Telugus it is one of the great folk heroic sagas of the nation. Different scholars like Akkairaju Umakantam from the region collected the narrative and published. Gene H. Roghair collected the epic from the Pichukunti performers and published it along with English translation and a scholarly editorial. The epic is very popular not only in Pichukunti katha but also other folk art forms like Burra katha, Sarada katha.

Katamaraju Kathalu
Katamaraju Kathalu is a very long folk ballad, a very popular heroic song of the land. It is a big epic of a battle between the kings of Katamaraju, and Manumasiddhi of the Nellore Chodas. The battle occurred in the 13th century, it is the dispute of territory and the misunderstanding of two kings. The valor of Khadga Tikkana and the Telugu kings has been portrayed in this heroic song and the epic is being carried through folk literature and the art form Kommula Katha or Pumba Katha, performed by the caste Kommulas. Telugu culture and the pastoral life are widely described in the long epic. It is not only rich for the description of culture of the land but also for the poetry and expressions of the singers. The epic singers Kommulas and Pumbalas perform it in such a way that the audience immerses in the themes and they identify themselves in all the rasas or the emotions of the narrative. The folk epic is a symbol of the pride of Telugus. This ballad cycle has been collected and published in two big volumes of around three thousand pages, enriched by scholarly editorial by Tangirala Venkata Subbarao.

Bobbili Katha

It is another heroic folk epic of Telugu it is not just an epic it is a recent history of Telugu land. Bobbili is a small principalityof Northern Andhra. The French commander, Marquis de Bussy-Castelnau, attacked the fort of Bobbili in 1757. This is happened because of the rivalry between the two kingdoms of Bobbili and Vijayanagaram. Ultimately the treachery of kind Vijayaramaraju resulted in the war. The Bobbili heroes fought against the guns and cannons of French soldiers with their swords and arrows until they fall on the battlefield. The French soldiers were astonished by the utmost courage shown by the kings of Bobbili and other soldiers and even by the women soldiers. The heroes Paparayudu, Rangarayudu, and Vengalarayudu became househo;d words in Andhra. The people sing the valor of their heroes with pride. The saga of heroes remained in different folk literary genres i.e. song, drama Burrakatha, Sarada Katha apart from the classical literary forms.

Other important narratives
Apart from the above very popular folk literary themes some other themes are also very popular in the land even in the modern times. All the caste myths regularly performed by the caste singers are very popular and considered sacred and authentic by their respective castes. More than 150 caste myths are alive and vibrant among the castes. Most of the myths of mother goddesses and the Perantal goddesses are also popular and heard with high respect, Ankamma katha, Maremma katha Ellamma katha, Mandhata katha, Tirupamma katha, Kamma katha, Sanysamma katha and such myths are still have currency in the folk life of Andhras. They are still being performed in the annual Jataras of the goddesses in most of the parts of Andhra.

Different types of folk tales shown in the aforementioned classification exist in Telugu folk literature. Short fables, bedtime tales, long wonder tales and such other types of tales still exist in large numbers. Balanagamma katha, Kumara Ramuni katha, Desingu raju katha and kasimajuli kathalu, Tenali Ramalingani kathalu and other tale cycles are very popular and taking breath in the winds of the Telugu villages.

Telugu folk song has a strong life it is very powerful across the ages. It is not only amusing the people by its sweet tunes but also shivering the misrules with its powerful words. Folk song when it is applied for the revolutionary is becoming a weapon. Folk song is not inferior to any literary genre, and it is very rich in Andhra Pradesh.

Hundreds and thousands of folk songs were collected right from 1850 to present day, several collections were published and number of scholars did research on different themes of folk songs and published these. Still lot of work has to be done and collection of the folk songs in district, mandal and village level has to be under taken. Song narratives particularly women's narratives on different themes are very important. Little attention has been paid to this genre. Song narratives of women are of two kinds: one is for at work and the other is for at home and in domestic rituals of vratas. Both are very important in terms of literature and gender issues.

Riddle is another very important prose genre of Telugu folk literature. Riddles in Telugu are entertaining and educating not only for the children but also for the elders. They come down from generation to generation. Telugu riddle does not have any ritual importance like riddles among other ethnic groups of the land. Thousands of riddles were collected by several scholars and published. Dr. Kasireddy Venkatareddy has done a remarkable research on Telugu riddles.

Some other unique folk literary genres also can be found in Andhra Pradesh in the performances by single individual artists like Pittala Dora, Harikatha and Runja Katha are unique in their mode of presentation and narrative techniques. The narrative in the Pittala dora is very interesting. It does not contain any story or theme but it is a prose rendition goes on more than an hour in each performance. It attracts big crowds in the villages. The text creates high quality of humor by the gossip and themeless boosting speech by the artist. In similar fashion Runja Katha is known for its unique kind of narrating techniques. One artist takes the roles of all characters of the theme. Harikatha is also performed by a single singer but it is supported by two to other musical instruments. Though it can be considered as a folk art form it is a semi classical in its nature, music and literature. Most of the themes in Harikatha are mythological.

Select bibliography
Arudra 1965 : Samgra Andhra Sahityam, (Vol.1) Secunderabad, M. Seshachalam & Co.
Andamma, M. 1983 : Nalgonda Gilla Gramadevatalu, Unpublished PhD thesis submitted to the Department of Telugu, Osmania University
Carr, M.W. 1868 (1988 reprint): A Collection of Telugu Proverbs, New Delhi, Asian Educational Services.
Krishna Kumar, N.1977: Telugu Janapada Geya Gadhalu, Hyderabad, Andhra Saraswata Parisht.
Krishnamoorty, BH.1979: Telugu Bhasha Charitra, Hyderabad, Andhra Pradesh Sahitya Akademi.
Mahadeva Sastri, Korada (ed) 1987: Kumarasambhavamu (by Nannechoda Kaviraju), Hyderabad, Telugu Viswavidyalam.
Ramaraju, B. 1978: Telugu Janapada Geya Sahityam, Hyderabad, janapada Prachuranalu.
1978b:Folklore of Andhra Pradesh, New Delhi, National Book Trust.
Roghair, Gene H.1982: The Epic of Palnadu. A Study and translation of palnati Vira Katha, A Telugu Oral Tradition from Andhra Pradesh, India, Oxford, Oxford University Press.
Subbachary, Pulikonda 2000: Telugu lo Kulapuranalu Asrita Vyavastha, Hyderabad, Prajashakti Book house.
Sundaram, R.V.S. 1983: Andhrula janapada Vignanam, Hyderabad, Andhra Pradesh Sahitya Akademi.
Venkata Subbarao, Tangirala. 1976: Katamaraju Kathalu (Vol.I), Hyderabad, Andhra Pradesh Sahitya Akademi.
1978: Katamaraju Kathalu (Vol.II) Hyderabad, Andhra Pradesh Sahitya Akademi.
2000: Telugu Vira Gatha Kavitvam, Bangalore, Sri Rasa.

References

Caste system in India
Dravidian peoples
Indian folklore
Society of India
Rituals in Hindu worship
Telugu-language literature